Glemham Hall is an Elizabethan stately home, set in around  of park land on the outskirts of the village of Little Glemham in Suffolk, England. It is a Grade I listed building, properly called Little Glemham Hall.

History

It was built around 1560 by the De Glemham family. It was purchased by Francis North, 2nd Baron Guilford of the North family in 1709, whose uncle Dudley North had earlier purchased the lordship of the manor of Little Glemham and Banyards; and between 1712 and 1720 major structural changes were made to the facade, giving it the overall Georgian appearance recognised today.

In 1791 Humphry Repton produced plans for the park; he commented on the H-shaped house in his works. At that time the owner was Dudley Long North. North was a politician and also a patron of George Crabbe, who held benefices at Parham and Great Glemham, and Crabbe met Charles James Fox and Roger Wilbraham at (Little) Glemham Hall; Crabbe lived at Great Glemham Hall, a different property owned by North not far away, for some years from 1796.

In the latter part of the 19th century the Hall was the residence of the MP Alexander George Dickson. It was purchased by the Cobbold family in 1923 in whose hands it has remained ever since. The current owner is Philip Hope-Cobbold, a Cobbold on his mother's side

Openings
It is today used mostly for corporate and social occasions and is not open to the general public although the gardens are open on selected days throughout the summer. The FolkEast Festival which is held on the parkland at Glemham Hall every August, attracting international acoustic, folk and roots musicians, whilst also championing local businesses, heritage and crafts.

Notes

References
Suffolk, a Shell Guide by Norman Scarfe. Shell, 1960

External links
Photos from Country Life
Mabel Eden's diaries, footnote on Glemham Hall
Manor of Glemham Parva

Houses completed in 1560
Country houses in Suffolk
Grade I listed buildings in Suffolk